Digital Life Design (DLD) is a global conference network, organized by  Munich-based DLD Media, a company of Hubert Burda Media.

In 2005, Stephanie Czerny founded DLD as an annual conference scheme. Its main purpose is to connect business, creative and social leaders, opinion formers, and investors for crossover conversation and inspiration. Since its first gathering, DLD hosted events in New York City, Beijing, San Francisco, London, Moscow, New Delhi, Rio de Janeiro, Hong Kong, Tel Aviv and Munich.

DLD Conference is referred to by the Economist as one of Europe's leading conferences on innovation. New-media site Sifted, backed by the Financial Times, recently ranked the event platform as one of  "Europe's best tech conferences".

The company's flagship conference, DLD Munich, hosts over 1000 guests from more than 50 countries. The three-day event always takes place in January, right before the World Economic Forum in Davos. DLD's motto, Connect the Unexpected, brings people together from various fields and interests, addressing a wide range of topics such as technology, arts, science and politics, and talking about the future and its implications on today's life.

Past speakers include Mark Zuckerberg, Lady Gaga, Yoko Ono, Jimmy Wales, Maria Ressa, Kai-Fu Lee, Francis Kéré, Satya Nadella, Zaha Hadid, Hans Ulrich Obrist, Scott Galloway, Sheryl Sandberg, Margrethe Vestager, Emmanuel Macron and many more.

Background
Stephanie Czerny is the event platform's co-founder and managing director, chaired by Hubert Burda and Yossi Vardi.

After bringing DLD Conference to life in 2005, DLD Media GmbH has been founded as a subsidiary of Hubert Burda Media to expand the brand. Steffi Czerny and Co-Founder Marcel Reichart were named its managing directors. Since then, the company has steadily grown and is now offering various conferences besides DLD Munich around the globe, as well as salons, dinners, lectures, hikes and other events.

All events are by invitation only. However, those interested can apply via the company's website.

Until 2018, the conference's venue was the listed bank building at Kardinal-Faulhaber-Straße 1 (HVB Forum). In 2019, DLD Munich took place at Alte Kongresshalle for the first time.

All talks and sessions can be watched over a live stream.

Each year the slogan of the conference accordingly changes to the dominant theme.

Aenne Burda Award
In memory of his mother's entrepreneurial and social commitment, Hubert Burda established the Aenne Burda Award for creative leadership, honoring women with visionary ideas.

Past laureates have been:

Media coverage
DLD is covered and attended every year by over 180 international journalists from opinion forming media such as The New York Times, Economist, Guardian, Fast Company, Fortune, Financial Times, FAZ, FOCUS, Spiegel, CNBC, Wall Street Journal, Thomson Reuters, Getty, Deutsche Welle, AllThingsD, Huffington Post and TechCrunch.

References

International conferences